Padilla Airport  is an airport just north of the town of Padilla in the Chuquisaca Department of Bolivia.

There is moderately high terrain off the ends of both runways.

See also

Transport in Bolivia
List of airports in Bolivia

References

External links 
OpenStreetMap - Padilla Airport
OurAirports - Padilla Airport
FallingRain - Padilla Airport

Airports in Chuquisaca Department